Çanakçı is a village in the Kiğı District, Bingöl Province, Turkey. The village is populated by Kurds and had a population of 134 in 2021.

The hamlet of Mahmudun is attached to the village.

References 

Villages in Kiğı District
Kurdish settlements in Bingöl Province